Tejarat-e-Farda (literally meaning Tomorrow's Business) is a weekly business magazine printed in the Islamic Republic of Iran. The weekly covers all political and economic events from the previous week, whilst also covering social and societal issues from the week previous. The weekly is often translated and quoted for its center right point of view. The magazine style format is popular among Iran's urban educated classes and covers national events with a business centric approach.

The magazine has been quoted in the international media, including the New York Times among some.

History
The weekly magazine was launched in 2008, as part of Donya-e-Eqtesad business group of magazines.

Notable interviews
The magazine often interviews leaders in Iran's business industry along with the occasional foreign interview translated into Persian, these include, Arash Vafadari, Gary Becker, Thomas Schelling, Mohammad Nahavandian among some.

See also
Economy of Iran
Media in Iran

References

2008 establishments in Iran
Iran
Magazines established in 2008
Magazines published in Tehran
Persian-language magazines